Samuel Gerald Jones (born August 12, 1954), known professionally as Sam J. Jones, is an American actor and former football player. He is known for playing the title character in the 1980 film Flash Gordon and for starring in the short-lived TV series The Highwayman (1987–1988).

Early life
Jones was born in Chicago, Illinois, and grew up in Sacramento, California. In 1972, after high school, Jones enlisted in the United States Marine Corps where he played American football. With service in the Corps completed, he moved to Seattle with the ambition of joining the Seahawks but was turned down. Instead, in 1976, he played for their practice team, the Flyers, as a semi-professional.

To supplement his income, Jones also began modeling. Starting in 1975, he appeared full-frontal nude under the alias "Andrew Cooper III" as the centerfold for a photo-spread in the June issue of Playgirl magazine. He also starred in TV commercials for a sporting goods store in Seattle before finally moving to Los Angeles in 1977.

Career
Jones made his first film appearance in the 1979 romantic comedy film 10. His appearance in 10 allowed him to beat Kurt Russell and Arnold Schwarzenegger for his most famous role, that of Flash Gordon in the 1980 film of the same name. Jones' hair was dyed blonde for this role. The film was moderately successful at the box office grossing $27.1 million in North America, and $22 million in the UK, double its $20 million budget. However, a falling-out between Jones and producer Dino De Laurentiis led to the scrapping of a planned film trilogy.

After the release of Flash Gordon, Playgirl reprinted his 1975 nude photo spread in its January 1981 issue, this time using his real name. He went on to play Chris Rorchek in the TV series Code Red (1981–1982). He had guest roles in other TV shows including The A-Team, Hunter, and Riptide. In 1987, he played the lead role in a TV adaptation of Will Eisner's comics character The Spirit. He also played the title character in the short-lived NBC sci-fi series The Highwayman. In the late 1980s and early 1990s he portrayed Johnny Valentine on the HBO series 1st & Ten.

Jones starred in the 1986 theatrical release My Chauffeur and the straight-to-video movies Jungle Heat (1985), Jane and the Lost City (1987), Under the Gun (1988), Silent Assassins (1988), Whiteforce (1988), Driving Force (1989), and One Man Force (1989). In the 1990s, Jones had roles in films including In Gold We Trust (1990), Maximum Force (1992), Fist of Honor (1993), Hard Vice (1994), Enter the Shootfighter (1995), Texas Payback (1995), The Killer Inside (1996), Earth Minus Zero (1996), Baja Run (1996) and American Tigers (1996), and guest roles in the TV shows Baywatch, Diagnosis Murder and Walker: Texas Ranger.

In 2001, Jones was cast in Animal Planet's family series Hollywood Safari as a park ranger. He appeared in "Deadman Switch", an episode of the television series Stargate SG-1. In 2002, Jones retrained and, when he is not acting or working autograph booths on the ComicCon circuit, he works as a high-end security professional in San Diego, protecting executives traveling to Mexico. In his words "I became a security professional 15 years ago. My wife looked at me and said, 'You've been waiting for the phone to ring. The phone isn't ringing. We have kids. There's the door. Don’t come back until you're providing.' That's why I walked away from labels years ago. Actor? I'm a working man. Whatever it takes to provide, I'm a working man".

In 2007, he played the prisoner Krebb in the Sci Fi Channel original television series Flash Gordon. He also had extended cameos (as himself, with his blond Flash Gordon hairstyle) in both the 2012 comedy film Ted and its 2015 sequel, Ted 2. Jones then starred in, and served as an executive producer of, Life After Flash, a crowdfunded feature-length documentary about Flash Gordon. The documentary, which chronicles the original film's production and cult following through interviews with fans and members of its cast and crew, including Melody Anderson, Brian Blessed, Peter Wyngarde, Mark Millar, Robert Rodriguez, Stan Lee and Brian May, also explores how Jones' falling-out with De Laurentiis impacted his life and career.

Personal life
Jones married Lynn Eriks in 1982; they had two children and divorced in 1987. Following the divorce from Eriks, he married Myrtille Blervaque, a French actress he met when he was filming on the island of Mauritius. They were married in Nevada on August 15, 1987, and divorced three years later.   He married Ramona Lynn Jones on June 26, 1992; they have three children.

Filmography

Film

Television

Video games

References

External links

 
 

1954 births
Male actors from Chicago
Male actors from Florida
American male film actors
American male television actors
Living people
People from West Palm Beach, Florida
Playgirl Men of the Month
United States Marines